PSG Esports is a French professional esports organisation founded in 2016. Based in Paris, it is the esports department of the parent club Paris Saint-Germain F.C. The organisation has active divisions in FIFA, League of Legends (PSG Talon), Dota 2 (PSG.LGD), FIFA Online, Brawl Stars, and Arena of Valor. It also had teams in Mobile Legends: Bang Bang (PSG.RRQ) and Rocket League. Since December 2020, the club has an online youth system in France and around the world called the Paris Saint-Germain Academy Esports.

Organization

Headquarters and training center

The Studio Paris Saint-Germain will be the headquarters and training center of PSG Esports and its professional teams. It will be located in Boulogne-Billancourt, inside the headquarters of parent club Paris Saint-Germain. Announced in December 2020, the studio is expected to open during the first half of 2021. This multifunctional space will host the Paris Saint-Germain Academy Esports and serve as a recording studio for the creation of digital content.

Academy

The Paris Saint-Germain Academy Esports is the online youth system of PSG Esports. Launched in December 2020, its goal is to sign the best young talents and prepare them for the professional gaming scene. This coaching platform, developed by GamerCoach, allows video game fans of different ages from all over the world to book individual online lessons with professional players from the Esports scene who have attended the club's training course. PSG's FIFA player Johann "ManiiKa" Simon has been the technical manager of the academy since April 2021.

Current divisions

FIFA

Founded in October 2016, PSG Esports immediately entered esports with football video game FIFA. The club's first signing was Danish prodigy and twice FIFA eWorld Cup champion August "Agge" Rosenmeier, alongside his coach Adel "Adellovich" Daher. PSG also launched its policy of young talented gamers with the capture of highly skilled rookie Lucas "DaXe" Cuillerier, considered a rising star of FIFA and one of the best player in the world. "DaXe" arrived with coach Alan "zaLdinho" Brin, whom the club hired to look after their new recruit.

In October 2016, "DaXe" became FIFA 17 World Champion at the Electronic Sports World Cup (ESWC) that took place during the Paris Games Week in Paris, bringing at the same time the first trophy for PSG Esports. In November 2016, "Agge" won the Legia eSports Cup, a tournament featuring ten FIFA players from professional football clubs, and the DreamHack Winter. "DaXe" claimed its second title with PSG Esports in April 2017 after winning the FIFA 17 tournament during the Gamers Assembly in Poitiers.

Rafael "Rafifa13" Fortes and Ahmed "Aameghessib" Al-Meghessib joined PSG's FIFA team in 2017. The duo went on to represent PSG at the 2017 FIFA eWorld Cup in London. After the World Cup, Johann "ManiiKa" Simon and Gordon "Fiddle" Thornsberry also arrived to the team. In turn, PSG released "Agge" from his contract in September 2017. In November 2017, "DaXe" retained its crown by becoming FIFA 18 world champion at the ESWC during the Paris Games Week. In April 2018, FIFA 17 world champion Corentin "RocKy" Chevrey joined PSG's FIFA roster. In May 2018, "Fiddle" won the Gfinity FIFA 18 US Spring Cup Xbox. In October 2018, Dany "Zack" Polònio joined as coach of "RocKy" and "ManiiKa". In November 2018, "Fiddle" left the club and signed with Cincinnati on a free transfer.

In February 2019, "DaXe" won the Orange e-Ligue 1 Winter Tournament on Xbox. He defeated Monaco's Florian "RayZiaaH" Maridat 4–3 in the final. Later that month, PSG Esports signed French FIFA YouTuber and specialist Arsène "AF5." As PSG Esports FIFA players were increasingly solicited, it became complicated for them to create content around their careers and share it with their fans, while remaining 100% focused on their competitions. "AF5" will follow the club's FIFA players on the competitions they are playing in and create exclusive content on their experiences and performances, starting with the FIFA eWorld Cup 2019.

"RocKy" left PSG by mutual consent in April 2019, without winning a single title during his tenure. "ManiiKa", along with his coach "Zack", also left the club in July 2019. "Rafifa13" and "DaXe" followed suit in September 2019 and May 2020, leaving "Aameghessib" as the only member of the club's FIFA roster. In early April 2021, however, "ManiiKa" returned to the squad. Later that month, promising young French gamer Ilias "NKANTEE" El Rhazzaz joined PSG's FIFA team.

Roster

League of Legends

The club announced their acquisition of the Team Huma spot for the 2017 European League of Legends (LoL) Challenger Series in October 2016. Rebranded as PSG eSports, the team's roster was revealed in December 2016. It consisted of Etienne "Steve" Michels, Jin "Blanc" Seong-min, Thomas "Kirei" Yuen, Hampus "Sprattel" Abrahamsson and Na "Pilot" Woo-hyung. In January 2017, before the start of the tournament, Hadrien "Duke" Forestier joined as coach.

Despite a rough start, PSG's LoL team made it to the European Challenger Series playoffs, where they faced Fnatic in a best of 5 to reach the European League Championship Series promotion tournament. PSG had only one point until the fourth week, but managed to win the next two series thanks in part to the arrival of Matti "WhiteKnight" Sormunen to the squad. However, the LCS promotion tournament's spot slipped through their fingers after losing against Fnatic. Following a disappointing Spring Split, PSG announced the departures of "Pilot", "Sprattel", "Steve", "WhiteKnight" "Fraid" and "Czaru". In turn, Tomáš "Nardeus" Maršálek, Lewis "NoXiAK" Felix, Johan "Klaj" Olsson and Max "Satorius" Günther arrived to the team for the Summer Split.

In October 2017, however, after failing to qualify for Europe's top League of Legends division, the League of Legends European Championship (LEC), PSG Esports announced its departure from the game. PSG's chief gaming officer Yassine Jaada said that game publisher Riot Games would move LEC to a UEFA style system, with an individual league for each country. Jaada explained that it was never in the club's strategy to remain at the national scale. The solution for the club was to join Dota 2, a game similar to LoL, but with a vastly different esports ecosystem.

The club confirmed its return to the game in June 2020. PSG Esports and Hong Kong based professional esports organisation Talon Esports concluded a multi-year team partnership agreement to form PSG Talon. The roster consists of Su "Hanabi" Chia-Hsiang, Kim "River" Dong-woo, Kim "Candy" Seung-ju, Wong "Unified" Chun Kit and Ling "Kaiwing" Kai Wing. The new co-branded League of Legends team lost the 2020 PCS Summer Split final to Machi Esports. Both of these teams had already secured spots at the 2020 League of Legends World Championship. Machi was seeded straight into the group stage, while PSG had to play their way through the play-ins to make it to the main event.

Roster

Dota 2

PSG Esports announced it would be signing the roster of Chinese Dota 2 team LGD Gaming in April 2018, rebranding themselves as PSG.LGD. The roster consists of Wang "Ame" Chunyu, Lu "Maybe" Yao, Yang "Chalice" Shenyi, Xu "Fy" Linsen, and Jian Wei "xNova" Yap. PSG.LGD won its first major trophy on Dota 2 after being crowned Epicenter XL Major champions in Moscow in May 2018. A few days later, PSG.LGD also claimed the MDL Changsha Major in Changsha and qualified for The International 2018.

In late January 2019, PSG.LGD announced midlaner Lu "Maybe" Yao would take some time off from the Dota 2 squad due to personal and physical reasons. CDEC Gaming's mid player, Guo "Xm" Hongchen, filled in while "Maybe" was out on leave. "Maybe" returned in late March 2019 after the end of the DreamLeague Season 11 and, thus, substitute "Xm" left the team. That month, the club also signed Yao "357" Yi and Yao "Yao" Zhengzheng as team coaches. "357" managed the squad until August 2019 and "Yao" became the sole coach. In early February 2020, "Ame" was replaced by Lai "Ahjit" Jay Son. A few days later, however, Li "ASD" Zhiwen unexpectedly took the place of "Ahjit" in the roster.

Roster

FIFA Online

Building on their success on Dota 2, PSG Esports and LGD Gaming expanded their partnership with the opening of a FIFA Online section in October 2018. The free-to-play dedicated to Asian territories entered the FIFA eWorld Cup circuit last year. Li "Yuwenc" Si-Jun, Mo "MzDragon" Zi-Long, Chen "Milano" Jun-Yu and Johann "ManiiKa" Simon initially joined the team coached by Dany "Zack" Polònio. Joseph "Zarate" Yeo Jia Hui and Liu "Ga" Jia-Cheng were later added to the roster in replacement of the departing "ManiiKa", "Yuwenc" and "Milano". Head coach "Zack" and remaining players "MzDragon", "Zarate" and "Ga" also left the club between 2019 and 2020. However, according to the club, the department is still active.

Brawl Stars

PSG Esports entered mobile game Brawl Stars in February 2019, with a team composed of Turkish gamer Murat "SunBentley" Can and French gamers Maxime "TwistiTwik" Alic and Anthony "Tony M" Cagny. That same month, PSG signed Théodore "Trapa" Bayoux as coach and YouTuber of the Brawl Stars team. In September 2019, the Brawl Stars team claimed their first title, being crowned champions of the ECN Brawl Stars Summer.

Danish player "Yde" and Austrian player "SkYRiiKZz" joined "SunBentley" and "TwistiTwik" in the squad shortly after the win, while Cagny left the team before PSG played in the Brawl Stars World Finals in November 2019. The club was eliminated in the quarterfinals by Japanese team Animal Champaru. In January 2020, the club announced the departure by mutual agreement of the four gamers as well as coach and YouTuber, "Trapa." They were replaced in March 2020 by a Singapore-based team composed of Asian gamers Nicholas "CoupdeAce" Wilson Ng, Kogure "Relyh" Yo, Jerome "Response" Kuek and Charleston "Scythe" Yeo as sub.

The new squad claimed the 2020 Brawl Stars World Championship in November 2020. The team dominated the World Finals and pocketed $200k. PSG Esports won all of their sets and became world champions. They defeated both Nova Esports and SK Gaming by a score of 3–0 in the quarterfinals and semifinals, respectively. The final against INTZ was a one-sided affair as well. PSG secured back-to-back victories in Gem Grab, Brawl Ball and Siege modes to secure a 3–0 win and the world title.

Roster

Arena of Valor

PSG Esports launched a team on Arena of Valor in August 2021. Currently one of the most popular multiplayer online battle arena games in Asia, and particularly in Thailand, the roster will consist of five Thai first-team players as well as a reservist. They joined the local club Buriram United FC and Spanish Valencia CF eSports in acquiring AoV teams. The team will take part in the RoV Pro League competitions.

Former divisions

Rocket League

In September 2017, PSG Esports announced its participation in the Rocket League Championship Series after picking up the previous Frontline roster, including Victor "Ferra" Francal, Dan "Bluey" Bluett, and Thibault "Chausette45" Grzesiak. In October 2017, PSG's trio dominated the Rocket League Championship Series Season 4 and qualified to the World Championship in October. A month later, they were also crowned ESL Championnat National champions at Paris Games Week, before finishing fifth in the World Championship, just off the podium.

In February 2018, PSG claimed the DreamHack Open Leipzig. In August 2018, the team signed Danish player Emil "Fruity" Moselund as replacement of the outgoing "Bluey". Later that month, the Rocket League team won the Rewind Gaming: The Colosseum tournament. In July 2019, PSG clinched the 2019 DreamHack Valencia, one of the major European competitions on Rocket League. In early August 2019, however, PSG unexpectedly announced that its Rocket League roster had departed from the club, a few weeks after the team won their second-ever major at DreamHack Valencia. However, PSG also stated that a further announcement will be made soon.

Mobile Legends: Bang Bang

In February 2019, after a strong partnership with LGD Gaming on Dota 2 and FIFA Online, which allowed the club to enter the Chinese market, PSG Esports announced a new partnership with the Rex Regum Qeon (RRQ) team and thus created a Mobile Legends: Bang Bang team. The club signed the roster of Indonesian Mobile Legends team RRQ, which consisted of Muhammad "Lemon" Ikhsan, Diky "Tuturu", William "Liam" Setiawan, Try "AyamJAGO" Sukardi, Chen "James" Jui Teng, and Calvien "InstincT".

The deal saw PSG become the first traditional sports team to enter mobile-game esports via the Mobile Legends: Bang Bang league with the rebranded PSG.RRQ squad. The move was designed to give the French club a greater presence in Asia, especially in Indonesia, which has an estimated 43 million gamers. The majority of the team's competitions were broadcast, while game results and statistics were available on Team RRQ's Instagram and YouTube channel.

In early July 2019, after several months of collaboration in which the PSG.RRQ team won the very first SEA Clash of Champions, the partnership between PSG Esports and Rex Regum Qeon came to an end. The new strategic orientation of PSG Esports will focus on other games, in particular Brawl Stars, which is exploding in Europe.

Honours

As of 22 November 2020.

References

External links

Official websites
PSG.FR - Site officiel du Paris Saint-Germain
PSG Esports: HOME

Paris Saint-Germain F.C.
2016 establishments in France
Esports teams based in France
FIFA (video game series) teams
Dota teams
Rocket League teams
Mobile Legends: Bang Bang teams